Lord Wood may refer to:

Alexander Wood, Lord Wood (1788–1864), Scottish lawyer
Stewart Wood, Baron Wood of Anfield (born 1968), Labour life peer